Three-ball (or threeball, 3 ball, 3-ball and other variant spellings) is pool (pocket billiards) game, played with three object balls; it has varying rules, but sometimes the 3 ball  is the game-winning ball. It may also refer to:

3 ball, the pool (pocket billiards) ball numbered "3" and colored red
3 ball, the green snooker ball, worth 3 points, normally referred to as "the green"
 Three-cushion billiards, a pocketless, carom billiards game, sometimes incorrectly referred to as three-ball

Other uses
 3-ball, a three-dimensional -ball in mathematics
 Slang term for three-point field goal, a basketball shot that is worth three points